Andrija Novakovich (born September 21, 1996) is an American professional soccer player who plays as a forward for Italian  club Venezia.

Career

Youth
Born and raised in Muskego, Wisconsin to Serbian parents, Novakovich spent his youth career with United Serbians, Red Star, and Chicago Magic. He was once named Gatorade Wisconsin Player of the Year after scoring 41 goals

Club
Despite signing a letter of intent to play college soccer at Marquette University, Novakovich agreed to join English Championship side Reading in April 2014, signing for the club in June of the same year, the move being made easier due to Novakovich holding a British passport through his mother who was born in England of Serbian descent.

On November 26, 2015, Novakovich joined National League side Cheltenham Town on loan until January 2, 2016. Novakovich returned to Reading on January 4, 2016 after Cheltenham Town didn't extend his loan deal.

On July 2, 2017, Reading announced that Novakovich had signed a new two-year contract with the club, and that he would join Eerste Divisie side SC Telstar for the 2017–18 season. A year later, June 20, 2018, Novakovich signed a new two-year contract with Reading and moved to Fortuna Sittard on a season-long loan deal.

On September 2, 2019, it was announced that Novakovich would leave Reading, with Frosinone paying an undisclosed fee for the player. Novakovich signed a contract with Frosinone lasting until 30 June 2022.

On July 15, 2022, Novakovich moved to another Italian club Venezia on a four-year contract.

International
In March 2018, Novakovich was called up to the USMNT for the first time for their international friendly against Paraguay on March 27, 2018. In the 77' minute, he earned his first cap replacing Bobby Wood, the goalscorer, in Cary, North Carolina at WakeMed Soccer Park. Novakovich holds both British and American passports and remains eligible to represent England or the United States in a competitive match, as well as Serbia, his father's birthplace.

Career statistics

References

External links
US Soccer Profile
Reading Profile

1996 births
Living people
American people of Serbian descent
People from Muskego, Wisconsin
Sportspeople from the Milwaukee metropolitan area
Soccer players from Wisconsin
American soccer players
Association football forwards
Reading F.C. players
Cheltenham Town F.C. players
SC Telstar players
Fortuna Sittard players
Frosinone Calcio players
Venezia F.C. players
English Football League players
National League (English football) players
Eerste Divisie players
Eredivisie players
Serie B players
United States men's youth international soccer players
United States men's under-20 international soccer players
United States men's international soccer players
American expatriate soccer players
American expatriate sportspeople in England
American expatriate sportspeople in the Netherlands
American expatriate sportspeople in Italy
Expatriate footballers in England
Expatriate footballers in the Netherlands
Expatriate footballers in Italy